The 2022 UCI Cyclo-cross World Championships were held between the 28th and 30th of January 2022 in Fayetteville, Arkansas, United States. It was the second time for the cyclo-cross world championships to held outside of Europe, the first instance having been in 2013 in Louisville, Kentucky, United States.

Medal summary

Medals table

Mixed relay (Test event)

References

UCI Cyclo-cross World Championships
World Championships
UCI
UCI
UCI